The African Democratic Party of Guinea, initially called Democratic Party of Guinea-Ahmed Sékou Touré (Parti démocratique de Guinée-Ahmed Sékou Touré) is a political party in Guinea. PDG-AST was founded in January 1994,  following a split in the Democratic Party of Guinea-African Democratic Rally (PDG-RDA). The party was led by Marcel Cross, father-in-law of Toure's son Mohammed.

In the lead-up to the split in PDG-RDA the PDG-AST founders largely centered their criticism against the party leader Ismael Gushein, whom they accused of 'political scheming'. In the bitterness around the party split, PDG-RDA branded PDG-AST as 'traitors'. PDG-AST upheld the legacy of the 12th PDG party congress, which had opened up for political and economic reforms. Whilst PDG-RDA became supportive of the government of Lansana Conte, PDG-AST joined the opposition camp. PDG-AST had a following among Malinke officers purged after the end of Sekou Toure's rule.

In May 1994 PDG-AST formed a pact with the National Democratic Union of Guinea. In the 1995 Guinean legislative election, the party obtained 1.15% of the proportional representation vote and won one seat.

Following the election, PDG-AST joined the Democratic Opposition Coordination (CODEM), a movement of 12 opposition parties protesting against the legitimacy of the official election result. Subsequently, the Supreme Court, based on a request from PDG-RDA, withdrew the registration of PDG-AST as a political party. The party subsequently took the name PDAG.

Ahead of the 1998 Guinean presidential election PDAG had entered a pact to support the candidature of RPG leader Alpha Condé. The day before the election security forces raided Cross' residence, arrested him and claimed that he was amassing arms for a coup d'état. He was released two months later.

References

Political parties in Guinea